The women's super-G competition of the PyeongChang 2018 Olympics was held at the Jeongseon Alpine Centre in PyeongChang on Saturday, 17 February.

Qualification

A total of  up to 320 alpine skiers qualified across all eleven events. Athletes qualified for this event by having met the A qualification standard only, which meant having 80 or less FIS Points and being ranked in the top 500 in the Olympic FIS points list. The Points list takes into average the best results of athletes per discipline during the qualification period (1 July 2016 to 21 January 2018). Countries received additional quotas by having athletes ranked in the top 30 of the current World Cup season (two per gender maximum, overall across all events). After the distribution of B standard quotas (to nations competing only in the slalom and giant slalom events), the remaining quotas were distributed using the Olympic FIS Points list, with each athlete only counting once for qualification purposes. A country could only enter a maximum of four athletes for the event.

Summary
Ester Ledecká became the Olympic champion, her first Olympic medal and the first gold medal in alpine skiing for the Czech Republic. The defending champion Anna Veith (competing as Fenninger in 2014) was second, and Tina Weirather was third, the first Olympic medal for Liechtenstein since 1988. The results were extraordinarily dense, with 0.01 seconds separating gold and silver medals, as well as bronze medal from the fourth place (Lara Gut). Ledecká's victory was completely unexpected, as she had been much better known for her snowboarding achievements. She subsequently won the parallel giant slalom snowboarding competition at the same Olympics.

Lindsey Vonn, starting first, was leading until her time was improved by Johanna Schnarf, then Lara Gut. Weirather, skiing seventh, improved Gut's time by 0.01 seconds, pushing Vonn, 0.26 seconds behind, off the podium. Starting 15th, Veith took the lead, with the main competitors either not finishing or posting inferior times, so that she believed her first place was assured, and some agencies announced her as a champion. However, the surprising champion was Ledecká who started 26th and improved Veith's time by 0.01. Ledecká's relative lack of experience in the super-G event might have led to her victory, as she took a more aggressive line that other, more experienced skiers shied away from. After the finish, Ledecká did not believe she won and thought that somebody else's time was shown by mistake.

Results
The race was started at 12:00 local time, (UTC+9).

References

Women's alpine skiing at the 2018 Winter Olympics